The Stymphalia chub (Squalius moreoticus) is a species of ray-finned fish in the family Cyprinidae. It is found in Lake Stymphalia and in the Vouraikos drainage in Greece.

References

Squalius
Fish described in 1971
Taxa named by Alexander I. Stephanidis